This article contains a list of fossil-bearing stratigraphic units in the state of Texas, U.S.

Sites

See also

 Paleontology in Texas

References

 
 

 Fossil
Texas
Texas geography-related lists
United States geology-related lists
Geology of Texas
.Stratigraphic units